Sophie & the Mad is a 2017 Iranian film directed by Mehdi Karampour.

Cast
 Amir Jafari as Amir
 Behafarid Ghafarian  as Sophie
 Mohamad Reza Sharifinia as Reza
 Elahe Hesari as Ziba
 Reza Yazdani as Singer

References

External links
 

2017 films
2017 drama films
Iranian drama films
2010s Persian-language films
Films set in Iran